Bratsberg is a village in Trondheim municipality in Trøndelag county, Norway. The village is located in the borough of Lerkendal, between the village of Tanem and the lake Jonsvatnet.

References

Villages in Trøndelag
Geography of Trondheim